Khaledeyn (also Romanized as Khāledeyn and Khāledīn) is a village in Ramkan Rural District, in the Central District of Qeshm County, Hormozgan Province, Iran. At the 2006 census, its population was 1,019, in 219 families.   The village suffered heavily in the 2005 Qeshm earthquake.

References 

Populated places in Qeshm County